This is a list of fossiliferous stratigraphic units in Ghana.



See also 
 Lists of fossiliferous stratigraphic units in Africa
 List of fossiliferous stratigraphic units in Ivory Coast
 Geology of Ghana

References

Further reading 
 D. Atta-Peters, and M.B. Salami. 2006. Aptian-Maastrichtian palynomorphs from the offshore Tano Basin, western Ghana. Journal of African Earth Sciences 43:379-394
 P. R. Racheboeuf, A. J. Boucot, and J. M. Saul. 1989. A Lower Carboniferous brachiopod fauna from the Sekondi area, coastal Ghana. Neues Jahrbuch fuer Geologie und Palaeontologie 1989(4):223-232

Ghana
 
Ghana
Fossiliferous stratigraphic units
Fossil